Kirkkojärvi is a common name of lakes in Finland. It may refer to:
 Kirkkojärvi (Espoo), a suburb and former lake in Espoo municipality, Southern Finland
Kirkkojärvi (Nurmijärvi), a lake in  Nurmijärvi municipality, Finland, better known as Nurmijärvi
 Kirkkojärvi (Salo), a lake in Salo, Finland
 Mahnalanselkä – Kirkkojärvi, a lake in Hämeenkyrö municipality, Western Finland
 Polyany, Leningrad Oblast, a lake in Russia, (Finnish name Muolaan Kirkkojärvi)